Prussia (Old Prussian: Prūsa or Prūsija) was a German state located on the southeast coast of the Baltic Sea. It formed the German Empire when it united the German states in 1871. It was de facto dissolved by an emergency decree transferring powers of the Prussian government to German Chancellor Franz von Papen in 1932 and de jure by an Allied decree in 1947. For centuries, the House of Hohenzollern ruled Prussia, expanding its size with the Prussian Army. Prussia, with its capital at Königsberg and then, when it became the Kingdom of Prussia in 1701, Berlin, decisively shaped the history of Germany.

The name Prussia derives from the Old Prussians; in the 13th century, the Teutonic Knights—an organized Catholic medieval military order of German crusaders—conquered the lands inhabited by them. In 1308, the Teutonic Knights conquered the region of Pomerelia with Danzig (modern-day Gdańsk). Their monastic state was mostly Germanised through immigration from central and western Germany, and, in the south, it was Polonised by settlers from Masovia. The imposed Second Peace of Thorn (1466) split Prussia into the western Royal Prussia, becoming a province of Poland, and the eastern part, from 1525 called the Duchy of Prussia, a feudal fief of the Crown of Poland up to 1657. The union of Brandenburg and the Duchy of Prussia in 1618 led to the proclamation of the Kingdom of Prussia in 1701.

Prussia entered the ranks of the great powers shortly after becoming a kingdom. It became increasingly large and powerful in the 18th and 19th centuries. It had a major voice in European affairs under the reign of Frederick the Great (1740–1786). At the Congress of Vienna (1814–15), which redrew the map of Europe following Napoleon's defeat, Prussia acquired rich new territories, including the coal-rich Ruhr. The country then grew rapidly in influence economically and politically, and became the core of the North German Confederation in 1867, and then of the German Empire in 1871. The Kingdom of Prussia was now so large and so dominant in the new Germany that  and other Prussian élites identified more and more as Germans and less as Prussians.

The Kingdom ended in 1918 along with other German monarchies that were terminated by the German Revolution. In the Weimar Republic, the Free State of Prussia lost nearly all of its legal and political importance following the 1932 coup led by Franz von Papen. Subsequently, it was effectively dismantled into Nazi German Gaue in 1935. Nevertheless, some Prussian ministries were kept and Hermann Göring remained in his role as Minister President of Prussia until the end of World War II. Former eastern territories of Germany that made up a significant part of Prussia lost the majority of their German population after 1945 as the Polish People's Republic and the Soviet Union both absorbed these territories and had most of its German inhabitants expelled by 1950. Prussia, deemed "a bearer of militarism and reaction" by the Allies, was officially abolished by an Allied declaration in 1947. The international status of the former eastern territories of the Kingdom of Prussia was disputed until the Treaty on the Final Settlement with Respect to Germany in 1990, but its return to Germany remains a cause among far-right politicians, the Federation of Expellees and various political revanchists and irredentists.

The terms "Prussian" and "Prussianism" have often been used, especially outside Germany, to denote the militarism, military professionalism, aggressiveness, and conservatism of the  class of landed aristocrats in the East who dominated first Prussia and then the German Empire.

Symbols

The main coat of arms of Prussia, as well as the flag of Prussia, depicted a black eagle on a white background.

The black and white national colours were already used by the Teutonic Knights and by the Hohenzollern dynasty. The Teutonic Order wore a white coat embroidered with a black cross with gold insert and black imperial eagle. The combination of the black and white colours with the white and red Hanseatic colours of the free cities Bremen, Hamburg and Lübeck, as well as of Brandenburg, resulted in the black-white-red commercial flag of the North German Confederation, which became the flag of the German Empire in 1871.

Suum cuique ("to each, his own"), the motto of the Order of the Black Eagle created by King Frederick I in 1701, was often associated with the whole of Prussia. The Iron Cross, a military decoration created by King Frederick William III in 1813, was also commonly associated with the country. The region, originally populated by Baltic Old Prussians who were Christianised, became a favoured location for immigration by (later mainly Protestant) Germans (see Ostsiedlung), as well as Poles and Lithuanians along the border regions.

Territory
Before its abolition, the territory of the Free State of Prussia included the provinces of East Prussia; Brandenburg; Saxony (including much of the present-day state of Saxony-Anhalt and parts of the state of Thuringia in Germany); Pomerania; Rhineland; Westphalia; Silesia (without Austrian Silesia); Schleswig-Holstein; Hanover; Hesse-Nassau; and a small detached area in the south called Hohenzollern, the ancestral home of the Prussian ruling family. The land that the Teutonic Knights occupied was flat and covered with fertile soil. The area was perfectly suited to the large-scale raising of wheat. The rise of early Prussia was based on the raising and selling of wheat. Teutonic Prussia became known as the "bread basket of Western Europe" (in German, Kornkammer, or granary). The port cities which rose on the back of this wheat production included: Stettin in Pomerania (now Szczecin, Poland); Danzig in Prussia (now Gdańsk, Poland); Riga in Livonia (now Riga, Latvia); Königsberg in Prussia (now Kaliningrad, Russia); and Memel in Prussia (now Klaipėda, Lithuania). Wheat production and trade brought Prussia into a close relationship with the Hanseatic League during the period of time from 1356 (official founding of the Hanseatic League) until the decline of the League in about 1500.

The expansion of Prussia based on its connection with the Hanseatic League cut both Poland and Lithuania off from the coast of the Baltic Sea and trade abroad. This meant that Poland and Lithuania would be traditional enemies of Prussia, which was still called the Teutonic Knights.

History

Teutonic Order

In 1211 King Andrew II of Hungary granted Burzenland in Transylvania as a fiefdom to the Teutonic Knights, a German military order of crusading knights, headquartered in the Kingdom of Jerusalem at Acre. In 1225 he expelled them, and they transferred their operations to the Baltic Sea area. Konrad I, the Polish duke of Masovia, had unsuccessfully attempted to conquer pagan Prussia in crusades in 1219 and 1222. In 1226 Duke Konrad invited the Teutonic Knights to conquer the Baltic Prussian tribes on his borders.

During 60 years of struggles against the Old Prussians, the Order established an independent state that came to control Prūsa. After the Livonian Brothers of the Sword joined the Teutonic Order in 1237, the Order also controlled Livonia (now Latvia and Estonia). Around 1252 they finished the conquest of the northernmost Prussian tribe of the Skalvians as well as of the western Baltic Curonians, and erected Memel Castle, which developed into the major port city of Memel (Klaipėda). The Treaty of Melno defined the final border between Prussia and the adjoining Grand Duchy of Lithuania in 1422.

The Hanseatic League officially formed in northern Europe in 1356 as a group of trading cities. This League came to hold a monopoly on all trade leaving the interior of Europe and Scandinavia and on all sailing trade in the Baltic Sea for foreign countries.

In the course of the Ostsiedlung (German eastward expansion) process, settlers were invited, bringing changes in the ethnic composition as well as in language, culture, and law of the eastern borders of the German lands. As a majority of these settlers were Germans, Low German became the dominant language.

The Knights of the Teutonic Order were subordinate to the papacy and to the emperor. Their initially close relationship with the Polish Crown deteriorated after they conquered Polish-controlled Pomerelia and Danzig (Gdańsk) in 1308. Eventually, Poland and Lithuania, allied through the Union of Krewo (1385), defeated the Knights in the Battle of Grunwald (Tannenberg) in 1410.

The Thirteen Years' War (1454–1466) began when the Prussian Confederation, a coalition of Hanseatic cities of western Prussia, rebelled against the Order and requested help from the Polish king, Casimir IV Jagiellon. The Teutonic Knights were forced to acknowledge the sovereignty of, and to pay tribute to Casimir IV in the Second Peace of Thorn (1466), losing western Prussia (Royal Prussia) to Poland in the process. Pursuant to the Second Peace of Thorn, two Prussian states were established.

During the period of the monastic state of the Teutonic Knights, mercenaries from the Holy Roman Empire were granted lands by the Order and gradually formed a new landed Prussian nobility, from which the Junkers would evolve to take a major role in the militarization of Prussia and, later, Germany.

Duchy of Prussia

On 10 April 1525, after signing of the Treaty of Kraków, which officially ended the Polish–Teutonic War (1519–21), in the main square of the Polish capital Kraków, Albert I resigned his position as Grand Master of the Teutonic Knights and received the title "Duke of Prussia" from King Zygmunt I the Old of Poland. As a symbol of vassalage, Albert received a standard with the Prussian coat of arms from the Polish king. The black Prussian eagle on the flag was augmented with a letter "S" (for Sigismundus) and had a crown placed around its neck as a symbol of submission to Poland. Albert I, a member of a cadet branch of the House of Hohenzollern became a Lutheran Protestant and secularized the Order's Prussian territories. This was the area east of the mouth of the Vistula River, later sometimes called "Prussia proper". For the first time, these lands came into the hands of a branch of the Hohenzollern family, who already ruled the Margraviate of Brandenburg, since the 15th century. Furthermore, with his renunciation of the Order, Albert could now marry and produce legitimate heirs.

Brandenburg-Prussia

Brandenburg and Prussia united two generations later. In 1594 Anna, granddaughter of Albert I and daughter of Duke Albert Frederick (reigned 1568–1618), married her cousin Elector John Sigismund of Brandenburg. When Albert Frederick died in 1618 without male heirs, John Sigismund was granted the right of succession to the Duchy of Prussia, then still a Polish fief. From this time the Duchy of Prussia was in personal union with the Margraviate of Brandenburg. The resulting state, known as Brandenburg-Prussia, consisted of geographically disconnected territories in Prussia, Brandenburg, and the Rhineland lands of Cleves and Mark.

During the Thirty Years' War (1618–1648), various armies repeatedly marched across the disconnected Hohenzollern lands, especially the occupying Swedes. The ineffective and militarily weak Margrave George William (1619–1640) fled from Berlin to Königsberg, the historic capital of the Duchy of Prussia, in 1637. His successor, Frederick William I (1640–1688), reformed the army to defend the lands.

Frederick William I went to Warsaw in 1641 to render homage to King Władysław IV Vasa of Poland for the Duchy of Prussia, which was still held in fief from the Polish crown. In January 1656, during the first phase of the Second Northern War (1654–1660), he received the duchy as a fief from the Swedish king who later granted him full sovereignty in the Treaty of Labiau (November 1656). In 1657 the Polish king renewed this grant in the treaties of Wehlau and Bromberg. With Prussia, the Brandenburg Hohenzollern dynasty now held a territory free of any feudal obligations, which constituted the basis for their later elevation to kings.

Frederick William I succeeded in organizing the electorate by establishing an absolute monarchy in Brandenburg-Prussia, an achievement for which he became known as the "Great Elector". Above all, he emphasised the importance of a powerful military to protect the state's disconnected territories, while the Edict of Potsdam (1685) opened Brandenburg-Prussia for the immigration of Protestant refugees (especially Huguenots), and he established a bureaucracy to carry out state administration efficiently.

Kingdom of Prussia

On 18 January 1701, Frederick William's son, Elector Frederick III, elevated Prussia from a duchy to a kingdom and crowned himself King Frederick I. In the Crown Treaty of 16 November 1700, Leopold I, emperor of the Holy Roman Empire, allowed Frederick only to title himself "King in Prussia", not "King of Prussia". The state of Brandenburg-Prussia became commonly known as "Prussia", although most of its territory, in Brandenburg, Pomerania, and western Germany, lay outside Prussia proper. The Prussian state grew in splendour during the reign of Frederick I, who sponsored the arts at the expense of the treasury.

Frederick I was succeeded by his son, Frederick William I (1713–1740), the austere "Soldier King", who did not care for the arts but was thrifty and practical. He was the main creator of the vaunted Prussian bureaucracy and the professionalised standing army, which he developed into one of the most powerful in Europe. His troops only briefly saw action during the Great Northern War. In view of the size of the army in relation to the total population, Mirabeau said later: "Prussia, is not a state with an army, but an army with a state." Frederick William also settled more than 20,000 Protestant refugees from Salzburg in thinly populated eastern Prussia, which was eventually extended to the west bank of the River Memel, and other regions. In the treaty of Stockholm (1720), he acquired half of Swedish Pomerania.

The king died in 1740 and was succeeded by his son, Frederick II, whose accomplishments led to his reputation as "Frederick the Great". As crown prince, Frederick had focused, primarily, on philosophy and the arts. He was an accomplished flute player. In 1740, Prussian troops crossed over the undefended border of Silesia and occupied Schweidnitz. Silesia was the richest province of Habsburg Austria. It signalled the beginning of three Silesian Wars (1740–1763). The First Silesian War (1740–1742) and the Second Silesian War (1744–1745) have, historically, been grouped together with the general European war called the War of Austrian Succession (1740–1748). Holy Roman Emperor Charles VI had died on 20 October 1740. He was succeeded to the throne by his daughter, Maria Theresa.

By defeating the Austrian Army at the Battle of Mollwitz on 10 April 1741, Frederick succeeded in conquering Lower Silesia (the northwestern half of Silesia). In the next year, 1742, he conquered Upper Silesia (the southeastern half). Furthermore, in the third Silesian War (usually grouped with the Seven Years' War) Frederick won a victory over Austria at the Battle of Lobositz on 1 October 1756. In spite of some impressive victories afterward, his situation became far less comfortable the following years, as he failed in his attempts to knock Austria out of the war and was gradually reduced to a desperate defensive war. However, he never gave up and on 3 November 1760 the Prussian king won another battle, the hard-fought Battle of Torgau. Despite being several times on the verge of defeat Frederick, allied with Great Britain, Hanover and Hesse-Kassel, was finally able to hold the whole of Silesia against a coalition of Saxony, the Habsburg monarchy, France and Russia. Voltaire, a close friend of the king, once described Frederick the Great's Prussia by saying "...it was Sparta in the morning, Athens in the afternoon."

Silesia, full of rich soils and prosperous manufacturing towns, became a vital region to Prussia, greatly increasing the nation's area, population, and wealth. Success on the battleground against Austria and other powers proved Prussia's status as one of the great powers of Europe. The Silesian Wars began more than a century of rivalry and conflict between Prussia and Austria as the two most powerful states operating within the Holy Roman Empire (although both had extensive territory outside the empire). In 1744, the County of East Frisia fell to Prussia following the extinction of its ruling Cirksena dynasty.

In the last 23 years of his reign until 1786, Frederick II, who understood himself as the "first servant of the state", promoted the development of Prussian areas such as the Oderbruch. At the same time he built up Prussia's military power and participated in the First Partition of Poland with Austria and Russia in 1772, an act that geographically connected the Brandenburg territories with those of Prussia proper. During this period, he also opened Prussia's borders to immigrants fleeing from religious persecution in other parts of Europe, such as the Huguenots. Prussia became a safe haven in much the same way that the United States welcomed immigrants seeking freedom in the 19th century.

Frederick the Great (reigned 1740–1786) practised enlightened absolutism. He built the world's best army, and usually won his many wars. He introduced a general civil code, abolished torture and established the principle that the Crown would not interfere in matters of justice. He also promoted an advanced secondary education, the forerunner of today's German gymnasium (grammar school) system, which prepares the brightest pupils for university studies. The Prussian education system was emulated in various countries, including the United States.

Napoleonic Wars

During the reign of King Frederick William II (1786–1797), Prussia annexed additional Polish territory through the Second Partition of Poland in 1793 and the Third Partition of Poland in 1795. His successor, Frederick William III (1797–1840), announced the union of the Prussian Lutheran and Reformed churches into one church.

Prussia took a leading part in the French Revolutionary Wars, but remained quiet for more than a decade because of the Peace of Basel of 1795, only to go once more to war with France in 1806 as negotiations with that country over the allocation of the spheres of influence in Germany failed. Prussia suffered a devastating defeat against Napoleon Bonaparte's troops in the Battle of Jena-Auerstedt, leading Frederick William III and his family to flee temporarily to Memel. Under the Treaties of Tilsit in 1807, the state lost about one-third of its area, including the areas gained from the second and third Partitions of Poland, which now fell to the Duchy of Warsaw. Beyond that, the king was obliged to pay a large indemnity, to cap his army at 42,000 men, and to let the French garrison troops throughout Prussia, effectively making the Kingdom a French satellite.

In response to this defeat, reformers such as Stein and Hardenberg set about modernising the Prussian state. Among their reforms were the liberation of peasants from serfdom, the Emancipation of Jews and making full citizens of them. The school system was rearranged, and in 1818 free trade was introduced. The process of army reform ended in 1813 with the introduction of compulsory military service for men. By 1813, Prussia could mobilize almost 300,000 soldiers, more than half of which were conscripts of the Landwehr of variable quality. The rest consisted of regular soldiers that were deemed excellent by most observers, and very determined to repair the humiliation of 1806.

After the defeat of Napoleon in Russia, Prussia quit its alliance with France and took part in the Sixth Coalition during the "Wars of Liberation" (Befreiungskriege) against the French occupation. Prussian troops under Marshal Gebhard Leberecht von Blücher contributed crucially (alongside the British and Dutch) to the final victory over Napoleon in the Battle of Waterloo of June 1815. Prussia's reward in 1815 at the Congress of Vienna was the recovery of her lost territories, as well as the whole of the Rhineland, Westphalia, 40% of Saxony and some other territories. These western lands were of vital importance because they included the Ruhr Area, the centre of Germany's fledgling industrialisation, especially in the arms industry. These territorial gains also meant the doubling of Prussia's population. In exchange, Prussia withdrew from areas of central Poland to allow the creation of Congress Poland under Russian sovereignty. In 1815 Prussia became part of the German Confederation.

Wars of liberation

The first half of the 19th century saw a prolonged struggle in Germany between liberals, who wanted a united, federal Germany under a democratic constitution, and conservatives, who wanted to maintain Germany as a patchwork of independent, monarchical states with Prussia and Austria competing for influence. One small movement that signalled a desire for German unification in this period was the Burschenschaft student movement, by students who encouraged the use of the black-red-gold flag, discussions of a unified German nation, and a progressive, liberal political system. Because of Prussia's size and economic importance, smaller states began to join its free trade area in the 1820s. Prussia benefited greatly from the creation in 1834 of the German Customs Union (Zollverein), which included most German states but excluded Austria.

In 1848 the liberals saw an opportunity when revolutions broke out across Europe. Alarmed, King Frederick William IV agreed to convene a National Assembly and grant a constitution. When the Frankfurt Parliament offered Frederick William the crown of a united Germany, he refused on the grounds that he would not accept a crown from a revolutionary assembly without the sanction of Germany's other monarchs.

The Frankfurt Parliament was forced to dissolve in 1849, and Frederick William issued Prussia's first constitution by his own authority in 1850. This conservative document provided for a two-house parliament. The lower house, or Landtag was elected by all taxpayers, who were divided into three classes whose votes were weighted according to the amount of taxes paid. Women and those who paid no taxes had no vote. This allowed just over one-third of the voters to choose 85% of the legislature, all but assuring dominance by the more well-to-do men of the population. The upper house, which was later renamed the Herrenhaus ("House of Lords"), was appointed by the king. He retained full executive authority and ministers were responsible only to him. As a result, the grip of the landowning classes, the Junkers, remained unbroken, especially in the eastern provinces.

Wars of unification

In 1862 King Wilhelm I appointed Otto von Bismarck as Prime Minister of Prussia. Bismarck was determined to defeat both the liberals and conservatives and increase Prussian supremacy and influence among the German states. There has been much debate as to whether Bismarck actually planned to create a united Germany when he set out on this journey, or whether he simply took advantage of the circumstances that fell into place. Bismarck curried support from large sections of the people by promising to lead the fight for greater German unification. He successfully guided Prussia through three wars, which unified Germany and brought William the position of German Emperor.

Schleswig Wars
The Kingdom of Denmark was at the time in personal union with the Duchies of Schleswig and Holstein, both of which had close ties with each other, although only Holstein was part of the German Confederation. When the Danish government tried to integrate Schleswig, but not Holstein, into the Danish state, Prussia led the German Confederation against Denmark in the First War of Schleswig (1848–1851). Because Russia supported Austria, Prussia also conceded predominance in the German Confederation to Austria in the Punctation of Olmütz in 1850.

In 1863, Denmark introduced a shared constitution for Denmark and Schleswig. This led to conflict with the German Confederation, which authorised the occupation of Holstein by the Confederation, from which Danish forces withdrew.  In 1864, Prussian and Austrian forces crossed the border between Holstein and Schleswig initiating the Second War of Schleswig. The Austro-Prussian forces defeated the Danes, who surrendered both territories. In the resulting Gastein Convention of 1865 Prussia took over the administration of Schleswig while Austria assumed that of Holstein.

Austro-Prussian War

Bismarck realised that the dual administration of Schleswig and Holstein was only a temporary solution, and tensions rose between Prussia and Austria. The struggle for supremacy in Germany then led to the Austro-Prussian War (1866), triggered by the dispute over Schleswig and Holstein, with Bismarck using proposed injustices as the reason for war.

On the Austrian side stood the south German states (including Bavaria and Württemberg), some central German states (including Saxony), and Hanover in the north. On the side of Prussia were Italy, most north German states, and some smaller central German states. Eventually, the better-armed Prussian troops won the crucial victory at the Battle of Königgrätz under Helmuth von Moltke the Elder. The century-long struggle between Berlin and Vienna for the dominance of Germany was now over. As a sideshow in this war, Prussia defeated Hanover in the Battle of Langensalza (1866). While Hanover hoped in vain for help from Britain (as they had previously been in personal union), Britain stayed out of a confrontation with a continental great power and Prussia satisfied its desire for merging the once separate territories and gaining strong economic and strategic power, particularly from the full access to the resources of the Ruhr.

Bismarck desired Austria as an ally in the future, and so he declined to annex any Austrian territory. But in the Peace of Prague in 1866, Prussia annexed four of Austria's allies in northern and central Germany—Hanover, Hesse-Kassel (or Hesse-Cassel), Nassau and Frankfurt. Prussia also won full control of Schleswig-Holstein. As a result of these territorial gains, Prussia now stretched uninterrupted across the northern two-thirds of Germany and contained two-thirds of Germany's population. The German Confederation was dissolved, and Prussia impelled the 21 states north of the Main River into forming the North German Confederation.

Prussia was the dominant state in the new confederation, as the kingdom comprised almost four-fifths of the new state's territory and population. Prussia's near-total control over the confederation was secured in the constitution drafted for it by Bismarck in 1867. Executive power was held by a president, assisted by a chancellor responsible only to him. The presidency was a hereditary office of the Hohenzollern rulers of Prussia. There was also a two-house parliament. The lower house, or Reichstag (Diet), was elected by universal male suffrage. The upper house, or Bundesrat (Federal Council) was appointed by the state governments. The Bundesrat was, in practice, the stronger chamber. Prussia had 17 of 43 votes, and could easily control proceedings through alliances with the other states.

As a result of the peace negotiations, the states south of the Main remained theoretically independent, but received the (compulsory) protection of Prussia. Additionally, mutual defence treaties were concluded. However, the existence of these treaties was kept secret until Bismarck made them public in 1867 when France tried to acquire Luxembourg.

Franco-Prussian War

The controversy with the Second French Empire over the candidacy of a Hohenzollern to the Spanish throne was escalated both by France and Bismarck. With his Ems Dispatch, Bismarck took advantage of an incident in which the French ambassador had approached William. The government of Napoleon III, expecting another civil war among the German states, declared war against Prussia, continuing Franco-German enmity. However, honouring their treaties, the German states joined forces and quickly defeated France in the Franco-Prussian War in 1870. Following victory under Bismarck's and Prussia's leadership, Baden, Württemberg and Bavaria, which had remained outside the North German Confederation, accepted incorporation into a united German Empire.

The empire was a "Lesser German" solution (in German, "kleindeutsche Lösung") to the question of uniting all German-speaking peoples into one state, because it excluded Austria, which remained connected to Hungary and whose territories included non-German populations. On 18 January 1871 (the 170th anniversary of the coronation of King Frederick I), William was proclaimed "German Emperor" (not "Emperor of Germany") in the Hall of Mirrors at Versailles outside Paris, while the French capital was still under siege.

German Empire

The two decades after the unification of Germany were the peak of Prussia's fortunes, but the seeds for potential strife were built into the Prusso-German political system.

The constitution of the German Empire was a version of the North German Confederation's constitution. Officially, the German Empire was a federal state. In practice, Prussia overshadowed the rest of the empire. Prussia included three-fifths of the German territory and two-thirds of its population. The Imperial German Army was, in practice, an enlarged Prussian army, although the other kingdoms (Bavaria, Saxony and Württemberg) retained their own small armies.  There was at first no navy. The imperial crown was a hereditary office of the House of Hohenzollern, the royal house of Prussia. The prime minister of Prussia was, except for two brief periods (January–November 1873 and 1892–94), also imperial chancellor. But the empire itself had no right to collect taxes directly from its subjects; the only incomes fully under federal control were the customs duties, common excise duties, and the revenue from postal and telegraph services. While all men above age 25 were eligible to vote in imperial elections, Prussia retained its restrictive three-class voting system. This effectively required the king/emperor and prime minister/chancellor to seek majorities from legislatures elected by two different franchises. In both the kingdom and the empire, the original constituencies were never redrawn to reflect changes in population, meaning that rural areas were grossly overrepresented by the turn of the 20th century.

As a result, Prussia and the German Empire were something of a paradox. Bismarck knew that his new German Reich was now a colossus and economically and militarily dominant in Europe; Britain was still dominant in finance and trade. He declared Germany a "satisfied" power, using his talents to preserve peace, for example at the Congress of Berlin.  Bismarck did not set up his own party. He had mixed success in some of his domestic policies. His anti-Catholic Kulturkampf inside Prussia (and not the wider German state) was a failure. He ended his support for the anticlerical Liberals and worked instead with the Catholic Centre Party. He tried to destroy the socialist movement, with limited success.  The large Polish population resisted Germanisation.

Frederick III became emperor in March 1888, after the death of his father, but he died of cancer only 99 days later.  At age 29, Wilhelm became Kaiser Wilhelm II after a difficult youth and conflicts with his British mother Victoria, Princess Royal. He turned out to be a man of limited experience, narrow and reactionary views, poor judgment, and occasional bad temper, which alienated former friends and allies.

Railways

Prussia nationalised its railways in the 1880s in an effort both to lower rates on freight service and to equalise those rates among shippers. Instead of lowering rates as far as possible, the government ran the railways as a profit-making endeavour, and the railway profits became a major source of revenue for the state. The nationalisation of the railways slowed the economic development of Prussia because the state favoured the relatively backward agricultural areas in its railway building. Moreover, the railway surpluses substituted for the development of an adequate tax system.

The Free State of Prussia in the Weimar Republic

Because of the German Revolution of 1918, Wilhelm II abdicated as German Emperor and King of Prussia. Prussia was proclaimed a "Free State" (i.e. a republic, German: Freistaat) within the new Weimar Republic and in 1920 received a democratic constitution.

Almost all of Germany's territorial losses, specified in the Treaty of Versailles, were areas that had been part of Prussia: Eupen and Malmedy to Belgium; North Schleswig to Denmark; the Memel Territory to Lithuania; the Hultschin area to Czechoslovakia. Many of the areas Prussia annexed in the partitions of Poland, such as the Provinces of Posen and West Prussia, as well as eastern Upper Silesia, went to the Second Polish Republic. Danzig became the Free City of Danzig under the administration of the League of Nations. Also, the Saargebiet was created mainly from formerly Prussian territories except present Saarpfalz district was part of Kingdom of Bavaria. East Prussia became an exclave, only reachable by ship (the Sea Service East Prussia) or by a railway through the Polish corridor.

The German government seriously considered breaking up Prussia into smaller states, but eventually traditionalist sentiment prevailed and Prussia became by far the largest state of the Weimar Republic, comprising 60% of its territory. With the abolition of the older Prussian franchise, it became a stronghold of the left. Its incorporation of "Red Berlin" and the industrialised Ruhr Area, both with working-class majorities, ensured left-wing dominance.

From 1919 to 1932, Prussia was governed by a coalition of the Social Democrats, Catholic Centre and German Democrats; from 1921 to 1925, coalition governments included the German People's Party. Unlike in other states of the German Reich, majority rule by democratic parties in Prussia was never endangered. Nevertheless, in East Prussia and some rural areas, the Nazi Party of Adolf Hitler gained more and more influence and popular support, especially from the lower middle class starting in 1930. Except for Catholic Upper Silesia, the Nazi Party in 1932 became the largest party in most parts of the Free State of Prussia. However, the democratic parties in coalition remained a majority, while Communists and Nazis were in the opposition.

The East Prussian Otto Braun, who was Prussian minister-president almost continuously from 1920 to 1932, is considered one of the most capable Social Democrats in history. He implemented several trend-setting reforms together with his minister of the interior, Carl Severing, which were also models for the later Federal Republic of Germany (FRG). For instance, a Prussian minister-president could be forced out of office only if there was a "positive majority" for a potential successor. This concept, known as the constructive vote of no confidence, was carried over into the Basic Law of the FRG. Most historians regard the Prussian government during this time as far more successful than that of Germany as a whole.

In contrast to its pre-war authoritarianism, Prussia was a pillar of democracy in the Weimar Republic. This system was destroyed by the Preußenschlag ("Prussian coup") of Reich Chancellor Franz von Papen. In this coup d'état, the government of the Reich deposed the Prussian government on 20 July 1932, under the pretext that the latter had lost control of public order in Prussia (during the Bloody Sunday of Altona, Hamburg, which was still part of Prussia at that time) and by using fabricated evidence that the Social Democrats and the Communists were planning a joint putsch. The Defence Minister General Kurt von Schleicher, who was the prime mover behind the coup manufactured evidence that the Prussian police under Braun's orders were favouring the Communist Rotfrontkämpferbund in street clashes with the SA as part of an alleged plan to foment a Marxist revolution, which he used to get an emergency decree from President Paul von Hindenburg imposing Reich control on Prussia. Papen appointed himself Reich commissioner for Prussia and took control of the government. The Preußenschlag made it easier, only half a year later, for Hitler to take power decisively in Germany, since he had the whole apparatus of the Prussian government, including the police, at his disposal.

Prussia and the Third Reich

After the appointment of Hitler as the new chancellor, the Nazis used the absence of Franz von Papen as an opportunity to appoint Hermann Göring federal commissioner for the Prussian ministry of the interior. The Reichstag election of 5 March 1933 strengthened the position of the National Socialist German Workers' Party (NSDAP or "Nazi" Party), although they did not achieve an absolute majority.

The Reichstag building having been set on fire a few weeks earlier on 27 February, a new Reichstag was opened in the Garrison Church of Potsdam on 21 March 1933 in the presence of President Paul von Hindenburg. In a propaganda-filled meeting between Hitler and the Nazi Party, the "marriage of old Prussia with young Germany" was celebrated, to win over the Prussian monarchists, conservatives and nationalists and induce them into supporting and subsequently voting in favor of the Enabling Act of 1933.

In the centralised state created by the Nazis in the "Law on the Reconstruction of the Reich" ("Gesetz über den Neuaufbau des Reichs", 30 January 1934) and the "Law on Reich Governors" ("Reichsstatthaltergesetz", 30 January 1935) the states were dissolved, in fact if not in law. The state landtage were abolished and the state governments were now controlled by Reichsstatthaltern (Reich Governors) who were appointed by the chancellor. Parallel to that, the organisation of the party into districts (Gaue) gained increasing importance, as the official in charge of a Gau (the head of which was called a Gauleiter) was again appointed by the chancellor who was at the same time chief of the Nazi Party.

This centralising policy went even further in Prussia. From 1934 to 1945, almost all ministries were merged and only a few departments were able to maintain their independence. Hitler himself became formally the governor of Prussia. However, his functions were exercised by Hermann Göring as Prussian prime minister.

As provided for in the "Greater Hamburg Act" ("Groß-Hamburg-Gesetz"), certain exchanges of territory took place. Prussia was extended on 1 April 1937, for instance, by the incorporation of the Free and Hanseatic City of Lübeck.

The Prussian lands transferred to Poland after the Treaty of Versailles were re-annexed during World War II. However, most of this territory was not reintegrated back into Prussia but assigned to separate Gaue of Danzig-West Prussia and Wartheland during much of the duration of the war.

The end of Prussia

The areas east of the Oder-Neisse line, mainly Eastern Prussia, Western Prussia, and Silesia, were annexed by Poland and the Soviet Union in 1945 owing to the Treaty of Potsdam between three of the Allies: the United States, United Kingdom, and the Soviet Union. This included important Prussian cities like Danzig, Königsberg, Breslau, and Stettin. The population fled, mostly to the Western zones, or was driven out.

As part of their wartime goals, the Western allies sought the abolition of Prussia. Stalin was initially content to retain the name, Russians having a different historical view of their neighbour and sometime former ally. Nonetheless, by Law No. 46, which was accepted and implemented by the Allied Control Council on 25 February 1947, Prussia was officially proclaimed to be dissolved.

In the Soviet occupation zone, which became East Germany (officially, the German Democratic Republic) in 1949, the former Prussian territories were reorganised into the states of Brandenburg and Saxony-Anhalt, with the remaining parts of the Province of Pomerania going to Mecklenburg-Western Pomerania. These states were de facto abolished in 1952 in favour of Bezirke (districts), but were recreated after German reunification in 1990.

In the Western Zones of occupation, which became West Germany (officially, the Federal Republic of Germany) in 1949, the former Prussian territories were divided up among North Rhine-Westphalia, Lower Saxony, Hesse, Rhineland-Palatinate and Schleswig-Holstein. Württemberg-Baden and Württemberg-Hohenzollern were later merged with Baden to create the state of Baden-Württemberg. The Saar region, which had been administered by the French as a protectorate separate from the rest of Western Germany, was admitted to the Federal Republic of Germany as a separate state following the 1955 Saar Statute referendum.

One year later, in 1957, the Prussian Cultural Heritage Foundation was established and implemented by federal statutes in West Germany in response to a ruling from the Federal Constitutional Court of Germany. The fundamental goal of this institution is protecting the cultural legacy of Prussia. As of 2021, it continues to operate from its headquarters in Berlin.

Administrative and constitutional frameworks

In the mid-16th century the margraves of Brandenburg had become highly dependent on the Estates (representing counts, lords, knights, and towns, but not prelates, owing to the Protestant Reformation in 1538). The margraviate's liabilities and tax income as well as the margrave's finances were in the hands of the Kreditwerk, an institution not controlled by the elector, and of the Großer Ausschuß ("Great Committee") of the Estates. This was because of concessions made by Elector Joachim II in 1541 in return for financial aid by the estates; however, the Kreditwerk went bankrupt between 1618 and 1625. The margraves further had to yield to the veto of the Estates in all issues concerning the "better or worse of the country", in all legal commitments, and in all issues concerning pawn or sale of the elector's real property.

To reduce the influence of the Estates, in 1604, Joachim Frederick created a council called Geheimer Rat für die Kurmark ("Privy Council for the Electorate", which instead of the Estates would function as the supreme advisory council for the elector. While the council was permanently established in 1613, it failed to gain any influence until 1651, owing to the Thirty Years' War (1618–1648)

Until after the Thirty Years' War, the various territories of Brandenburg-Prussia remained politically independent from each other, connected only by the common feudal superior. Frederick William (ruled 1640–1688), who envisioned the transformation of the personal union into a real union, started to centralise the Brandenburg-Prussian government with an attempt to establish the Geheimer Rat as a central authority for all territories in 1651, but this project proved infeasible. Instead, the elector continued to appoint a governor (Kurfürstlicher Rat) for each territory, who in most cases was a member of the Geheimer Rat. The most powerful institution in the territories remained the governments of the estates (Landständische Regierung, named Oberratsstube in Prussia and Geheime Landesregierung in Mark and Cleves), which were the highest government agencies regarding jurisdiction, finances and administration. The elector attempted to balance the Estates' governments by creating Amtskammer chambers to administer and coordinate the elector's domains, tax income and privileges. Such chambers were introduced in Brandenburg in 1652, in Cleves and Mark in 1653, in Pomerania in 1654, in Prussia in 1661 and in Magdeburg in 1680. Also in 1680, the Kreditwerk came under the aegis of the elector.

Frederick William I's excise tax (Akzise), which from 1667 replaced the property tax raised in Brandenburg for Brandenburg-Prussia's standing army with the Estates' consent, was raised by the elector without consultation with the Estates. The conclusion of the Second Northern War of 1655–1660 had strengthened the elector politically, enabling him to reform the constitution of Cleves and Mark in 1660 and 1661 to introduce officials loyal to him and independent of the local estates. In the Duchy of Prussia he confirmed the traditional privileges of the Estates in 1663, but the latter accepted the caveat that these privileges were not to be used to interfere with the exertion of the elector's sovereignty. As in Brandenburg, Frederick William ignored the privilege of the Prussian Estates to confirm or veto taxes raised by the elector: while in 1656, an Akzise was raised with the Estates' consent, the elector by force collected taxes not approved by the Prussian Estates for the first time in 1674. From 1704 the Prussian estates de facto relinquished their right to approve the elector's taxes while formally still entitled to do so. In 1682 the elector introduced an Akzise to Pomerania and in 1688 to Magdeburg, while in Cleves and Mark an Akzise was introduced only between 1716 and 1720. Owing to Frederick William I's reforms, the state income increased threefold during his reign, and the tax burden per subject reached a level twice as high as in France.

Under the rule of Frederick III (I) (in office: 1688–1713), the Brandenburg Prussian territories were de facto reduced to provinces of the monarchy. Frederick William's testament would have divided Brandenburg-Prussia among his sons, but his firstborn son Frederick III (I), with the emperor's backing, succeeded in becoming the sole ruler based on the Treaty of Gera of 1599, which forbade a division of Hohenzollern territories. In 1689, a new central chamber for all Brandenburg-Prussian territories was established, called Geheime Hofkammer (from 1713: Generalfinanzdirektorium). This chamber functioned as a superior agency of the territories' Amtskammer chambers. The General War Commissariat (Generalkriegskommissariat) emerged as a second central agency, superior to the local Kriegskommissariat agencies initially concerned with the administration of the army, but before 1712 transformed into an agency also concerned with general tax and police tasks.

The Kingdom of Prussia functioned as an absolute monarchy until the German revolutions of 1848–1849, after which Prussia became a constitutional monarchy and Adolf Heinrich von Arnim-Boitzenburg was elected as Prussia's first prime minister (Ministerpräsident). Prussia's first constitution dated from 1848. The 1850 Prussian Constitution established a two-chamber parliament. The lower house, or Landtag represented all taxpayers, who were divided into three classes according to the amount of taxes paid. This allowed just over 25% of the voters to choose 85% of the legislature, all but assuring dominance by the more well-to-do elements of the population. The upper house (First Chamber or Erste Kammer), later renamed the Prussian House of Lords (Herrenhaus), was appointed by the king. He retained full executive authority and ministers were responsible only to him. As a result, the grip of the landowning classes, the Junkers, remained unbroken, especially in the eastern provinces. The Prussian Secret Police, formed in response to the German revolutions of 1848–1849, aided the conservative government.

Prussia inside Weimar Republic 

Unlike its authoritarian pre-1918 predecessor, Prussia from 1918 to 1932 was a promising democracy within Germany. The abolition of the political power of the aristocracy transformed Prussia into a region strongly dominated by the left wing of the political spectrum, with "Red Berlin" and the industrial centre of the Ruhr Area exerting major influence. During this period a coalition of centre-left parties ruled, predominantly under the leadership (1920–1932) of East Prussian Social Democrat Otto Braun. While in office Braun implemented several reforms (together with his Minister of the Interior, Carl Severing) that became models for the later Federal Republic of Germany. For instance, a Prussian prime minister could only be forced out of office if there was a "positive majority" for a potential successor. This concept, known as the constructive vote of no confidence, became part of the Basic Law of the Federal Republic of Germany. Historians regard the Prussian government during the 1920s as far more successful than that of Germany as a whole.

Similar to other German states both now and at the time, executive power remained vested in a Minister-President of Prussia and in laws established by a Landtag elected by the people.

Social history

Population

In 1871, Prussia's population numbered 24.69 million, accounting for 60% of the German Empire's population. The population grew rapidly from 45 million in 1880 to 56 million in 1900, thanks to declining mortality, even as birth rates declined.  About 6 million Germans, primarily young families migrated to the United States, especially the mid-western farming regions.  Their place in agriculture was often taken by young Polish farm workers. In addition, large numbers of Polish miners moved to Upper Silesia and many Germans and Poles moved to industrial jobs in the fast-growing cities especially in the Rhineland and Westphalia. In 1910, the population had increased to 40.17 million (62% of the Empire's population). In 1914, Prussia had an area of 354,490 km2. In May 1939 Prussia had an area of 297,007 km2 and a population of 41,915,040 inhabitants.

Religion

The Duchy of Prussia was the first state to officially adopt Lutheranism in 1525. In the wake of the Reformation, Prussia was dominated by two major Protestant confessions: Lutheranism and Calvinism. The majority of the Prussian population was Lutheran, although there were dispersed Calvinist minorities in central and western parts of the state especially Brandenburg, Rhineland, Westphalia and Hesse-Nassau. In 1613, John Sigismund, Elector of Brandenburg and Grand Duke of Prussia declared himself for the Calvinist creed and transferred the Berlin Cathedral from the Lutheran to the Calvinist church. Lutherans and Calvinist congregations all over the kingdom were merged in 1817 by the Prussian Union of churches, which came under tight royal control. In Protestant regions, writes Nipperdey:

Prussia received significant Huguenot population after the issuing of the Edict of Fontainebleau by Louis XIV of France and the following dragonnades. Prussian monarchs, beginning with Frederick William, Elector of Brandenburg opened the country to the fleeing French Calvinist refugees. In Berlin, they built and worshipped at their own church called the French Cathedral on Gendarmenmarkt. Time passed by, and the French Reformed assimilated into the wider Protestant community in Prussia. East Prussia's southern region of Masuria was mostly made up of Germanised Lutheran Masurians.

After 1814, Prussia contained millions of Catholics in the west and in the east. There were substantial populations in the Rhineland, parts of Westphalia, eastern parts of Silesia, West Prussia, Ermland and the Province of Posen. Communities in Poland were often ethnically Polish, although this is not the case of eastern Silesia as the majority of Catholics there were German. During the 19th-century Kulturkampf, Prussian Catholics were forbidden from fulfilling any official functions for the state and were largely distrusted.

Prussia contained a relatively large Jewish community, which was mostly concentrated in large urban areas. According to the 1880 census, it was the biggest one in Germany with 363,790 individuals.

In 1925, 64.9% of the Prussian population was Protestant, 31.3% was Catholic, 1.1% was Jewish, 2.7% was placed in other religious categories.

Non-German population

In 1871, approximately 2.4 million Poles lived in Prussia, constituting the largest minority. Other minorities were Jews, Danes, Frisians, Dutchmen, Kashubians (72,500 in 1905), Masurians (248,000 in 1905), Lithuanians (101,500 in 1905), Walloons, Czechs, Kursenieki, and Sorbs.

The area of Greater Poland, where the Polish nation had originated, became the Province of Posen after the Partitions of Poland. Poles in this Polish-majority province (62% Polish, 38% German) resisted German rule. Also, the southeast portion of Silesia (Upper Silesia) had a Polish majority. But Catholics and Jews did not have equal status with Protestants.

As a result of the Treaty of Versailles in 1919, the Second Polish Republic was granted not only these two areas, but also areas with a German majority in the Province of West Prussia. After World War II, East Prussia, Silesia, most of Pomerania and the eastern part of Brandenburg were either annexed by the Soviet Union or given to Poland, and the German-speaking populations forcibly expelled.

Education

The German states in the 19th century were world leaders in prestigious education and Prussia set the pace. For boys free public education was widely available, and the gymnasium system for elite students was highly professionalized. The modern university system emerged from the 19th century German universities, especially Friedrich Wilhelm University (now named Humboldt University of Berlin). It pioneered the model of the research university with well-defined career tracks for professors. The United States, for example, paid close attention to German models. Families focused on educating their sons. The traditional schooling for girls was generally provided by mothers and governesses.  Elite families increasingly favoured Catholic convent boarding schools for their daughters.  Prussia's Kulturkampf laws in the 1870s limited Catholic schools thus providing an opening for a large number of new private schools for girls.

See also

 Alte Nationalgalerie, Berlin
 Altes Museum, Berlin
 Bode Museum, Berlin
 East Prussian Regional Museum
 List of museums and galleries in Berlin
 List of museums in Germany

References
Informational notes

Citations

Further reading
 
 , covers medieval period
 Carroll, E. Malcolm. Germany and the great powers, 1866–1914: A study in public opinion and foreign policy (1938) online; 862pp.
 Clark, Christopher. Iron Kingdom: The Rise and Downfall of Prussia, 1600–1947 (2009), a standard scholarly history 
 Craig, Gordon. The politics of the Prussian Army 1640-1945 (1955)  online
 Fay, Sidney Bradshaw. The Rise of Brandenburg-Prussia To 1786 (1937) online
  online review
 Friedrich, Karin. Brandenburg-Prussia, 1466–1806: The Rise of a Composite State (Palgrave Macmillan, 2011); 157pp. Emphasis on historiography.
 Glees, Anthony. "Albert C. Grzesinski and the politics of Prussia, 1926-1930." English Historical Review 89.353 (1974): 814–834. online
 
 Hamerow, Theodore S. Restoration, Revolution, Reaction: Economics and Politics in Germany, 1815–1871 (1958) online
 Hamerow, Theodore S. The social foundations of German unification, 1858-1871 (1969) online
 Henderson, William O. The state and the industrial revolution in Prussia, 1740–1870 (1958) online
 
 Horn, David Bayne. Great Britain and Europe in the eighteenth century (1967) covers 1603–1702; pp 144–177 for Prussia; pp 178–200 for other Germany; 111–143 for Austria
 Hornung, Erik. "Immigration and the diffusion of technology: The Huguenot diaspora in Prussia." American Economic Review 104.1 (2014): 84–122. online
 Koch, H. W. History of Prussia (1987) online
 Kotulla, Michael. Deutsche Verfassungsgeschichte: vom Alten Reich bis Weimar (1495–1934) (Springer, 2008) 
 
 Muncy, Lysbeth W. "The Junkers and the Prussian Administration from 1918 to 1939." Review of Politics 9.4 (1947): 482–501. online
 Nipperdey, Thomas. Germany from Napoleon to Bismarck: 1800–1866 (1996). excerpt
 Orlow, Dietrich. Weimar Prussia, 1918-1925: The Unlikely Rock of Democracy (1986) online.
 Orlow, Dietrich. Weimar Prussia, 1925-1933: The Illusion of Strength (1991). online
 , stress on cultural topics
 Sagarra, Eda. A Social History of Germany, 1648–1914 (1977) online
 Schulze, Hagen, and Philip G. Dwyer. "Democratic Prussia in Weimar Germany, 1919–33." in Modern Prussian History 1830–1947 (Routledge, 2014) pp. 211–229.
 
 Taylor, A. J. P. The Course of German History: A Survey of the Development of German History since 1815 (1945) online 
 Taylor, A. J. P. Bismarck (1955)  online
 Treasure, Geoffrey. The Making of Modern Europe, 1648–1780 (3rd ed. 2003). pp 427–462.

External links

 population history
 Preußen-Chronik.de chronology and summaries
 Prussian Cultural Heritage Foundation website 
 Stiftung Preußischer Kulturbesitz (picture archive).
 Foundation for Prussian Palaces and Gardens Berlin-Brandenburg

 
States and territories established in 1525
States and territories disestablished in 1947
Former countries in Europe
History of Brandenburg
1525 establishments in Prussia
1947 disestablishments in Prussia
Historical regions